Stratonicus (in Greek Στρατόνικoς; lived 4th century BC), of Athens, was a distinguished musician of the time of Alexander the Great (336–323 BC), of whom scarcely anything is recorded, except the sharp and witty rebuke which he administered to Philotas, when the latter boasted of a victory which he had gained over Timotheus of Miletus. His character is also revealed by another anecdote:

It is told that Nicocles, king of Cyprus, killed him for some satyric pieces he had composed on Nicocles' sons.

References
Smith, William; Dictionary of Greek and Roman Biography and Mythology, "Stratonicus", Boston, (1867)

Notes

Ancient Greek musicians
4th-century BC Athenians